Uromastyx occidentalis is a species of agamid lizard. It is found in the Western Sahara.

References

Uromastyx
Reptiles described in 1999